Coniston Co-operative Society is a small consumer co-operative in Furness, Cumbria, England. It is one of the few retail societies operating a single village store to remain independent.

Founded as Sawrey Co-operative Society in 1875, a branch was opened in nearby Coniston in 1898. The present name was adopted when the Far Sawrey store ceased trading in 1905.

Coniston Co-op is a registered society, democratically controlled by its members. It is a member of Co-operatives UK, The Co-operative Group and the Federal Retail and Trading Services buying group.

See also 
British co-operative movement

References

External links
Coniston Co-operative Society

Consumers' co-operatives of the United Kingdom
Business services companies established in 1875
Retail companies established in 1875
Coniston, Cumbria